Orlando Weekly is a liberal progressive alternative newsweekly distributed in the Greater Orlando area of Florida. Every Thursday, 40,000 issues of the paper are distributed to more than 1,100 locations across Orange, Osceola and Seminole counties.

Orlando Weekly organizes an annual feature Best of Orlando issue that features the best Orlando has to offer in dining, music and nightlife, arts and culture, goods and services. Each year readers vote in the paper's poll to vote for their favorite Orlando restaurants, bars, boutiques, museums, local celebs and more. The paper also publishes an annual dining guide called BITE, which features capsule reviews of hundreds of area restaurants, and an Annual Manual, an insider's guide to the region.

History
The paper was founded in the 1980s as the Orange Shopper. It was purchased by the Toronto Sun, which changed its name to the Weekly and transformed it into a tabloid publication. The Weekly was later sold to the Detroit-based Alternative Media Inc., a publisher of alternative newsweekly Detroit Metro Times. Co-founder of Alternative Media Inc., Ron Williams, transformed the paper into not just a tabloid but an alternative news source dedicated to investigative journalism. In 1997, Alternative Media Inc. also purchased the San Antonio Current; by 1998, the company was entertaining multiple offers for its stable of weeklies. In 1999, the papers were purchased by Times-Shamrock Communications. In 2013, Times-Shamrock sold the paper to Euclid Media Group.

Association of Alternative Newsmedia Awards
2018 AAN
LGBT Coverage 1st PLACE: Orlando Weekly: By night, Orlando's drag queens entertain the masses. By day, they lead the fight for LGBTQ rights by Monivette Cordeiro
Arts Criticism 2nd PLACE: Orlando Weekly: (I; II; III) by Jessica Bryce Young, Richard Reep
INNOVATION / FORMAT BUSTER 1st PLACE: Orlando Weekly: Florida Film Fest/420 Issue by Chaya Av, Chris Tobar Rodriguez, Jessica Bryce Young

2017 AAN
LGBT Coverage 2nd PLACE: Orlando Weekly: Pulse In Memoriam: Remembering the Orlando 49 (I; II; III; IV; V) by Monivette Cordeiro
Film Criticism 1st PLACE: Orlando Weekly: Film Criticism (I; II; III) by Thaddeus McCollum
Illustration 1st PLACE: Orlando Weekly: Heavy is the Head by Samantha Shumaker
Photography 2nd PLACE: Orlando Weekly: Pulse Photographs by Monivette Cordeiro

2014 AAN
Arts Criticism 1st Place: Malick SidibÃ©; I Believe in You; and And Every Day Was Overcast by Jessica Bryce Young, Orlando Weekly

2013 AAN
Breaking News 3rd Place: Sick of It (Part 1; Part 2; Part 3; Part 4; Part 5) by Billy Manes, Orlando Weekly

2012 AAN
Special Topic: Economic Equality 2nd Place: Bare Minimum by Jeff Gore, Orlando Weekly

2010 AAN
Illustration First Place: Orlando Weekly, Fringe Free-For-All by Jeff Drew
Arts Criticism Third Place: Orlando Weekly, Ecstatic Transformations and Summer Studies by Jessica Bryce Young 

2009 AAN
First Place: Orlando Weekly, Might Makes Right by Jeffrey C. Billman

Controversies
The paper has been historically critical of anti-homeless laws passed in Orlando, including a controversial city law that prohibits advocates for the homeless from feeding large groups of people in public spaces within two miles of Orlando's City Hall without a permit. Orlando Weekly has also taken a decidedly critical stance on controversial Republican Florida Gov. Rick Scott who took office in 2011, as well as recent legislative efforts to pass laws that infringe on women's rights.

In 2007, the paper ran afoul of Orlando's Metropolitan Bureau of Investigation when they staged a raid on the publication and arrested three of its advertising representatives for allegedly supporting prostitution. Daniel Aaronson, a longtime Fort Lauderdale criminal defense lawyer and First Amendment specialist, called the arrests and police actions "incredibly repugnant." Aaronson said the Weekly did nothing wrong if they simply took and ran adult-oriented advertisements."The papers aren't doing anything illegal. They're taking ads. If an ad uses suggestive language, the stopping of these ads threatens the First Amendment," said Aaronson, who has represented adult entertainment clubs, bookstores, and swinger clubs. The paper considers this act retaliation for past negative coverage of the agency. On February 27, 2008, the Metropolitan Bureau of Investigation dropped all charges in the criminal case.

References

External links
 Official site

Newspapers published in Florida
Alternative weekly newspapers published in the United States
Mass media in Orlando, Florida
1990 establishments in Florida
Publications established in 1990